Dancing tradition in Serbia is represented by various styles of dances in the country and it is called Kolo. The word Kolo originated from the Slavic word meaning a ‘wheel,’ circle, or circuit.  As with other aspects of Serbian culture, different forms of dances originated in different parts of Serbia, developed according to the local traditions and also acquired elements from other parts of the country. Kolo used to be performed near churches, at war fronts, weddings, and other occasions; the Serbian community described it as a circle dance around the church. At these celebrations, the Serbians start a circle dance, then, people hold each other’s hands, making a chain or a union, following the same rhythm; their hands are either in a V or W formation. 

Serbian folk dancing, kolo ("circle [dance]"), includes many varieties. The most popular dances are Užičko kolo, and Moravac, while other popular dances include Kokonješte, Žikino kolo and Vranjanka.

Dances

Užičko kolo (from Užice), is one of the most widespread songs for dancing as it was composed by Milija Spasojevic, an accordionist from former Yugoslavia. 
Moravac (from Great Morava), derived from Sumadija, which is a Region in Central Serbia. The dance structure is performed to a 2/4 beat in an open circle of dancers where the dance moves counterclockwise.
Kokonješte, translates from the Romanian word "coconeşte, which means in the style of a young nobleman." Kokonjeste is danced to many different tunes, although the music that became the most popular, "Arapsko Kokonješte" (meaning Arabian, as in the horse), was brought to the United States of America by Serbs who lived in the Austro-Hungarian Empire.
Žikino kolo, translates to Zika's circle dance, it is performed to a  7/8 beat (in some places, it's noted as 3/4).
Vranjanka (from Vranje). 
Bojerka (Serbian noble dance), “Biserka-Bojerka" are two different melodies, to which the same dance was done in an urban circle. “Biserka” is derived from the word “biser,” meaning “pearl” or “jewel." "Bojerka" is derived from the Romanian "Boiereasca" which means "Noble Woman". This was danced in elegent balls.
Oro (Serbian eagle dance from Montenegro and Herzegovina)
Čačak Kolo

See also

Serbian folklore
Serbian music
Serbian folk music
Serbian culture

References

Sources

 
Serbian culture